The 1992 Norwegian Football Cup Final was the final match of the 1992 Norwegian Football Cup, the 87th season of the Norwegian Football Cup, the premier Norwegian football cup competition organized by the Football Association of Norway (NFF). The match was played on 25 October 1992 at the Ullevaal Stadion in Oslo, and opposed two Tippeligaen sides Rosenborg and Lillestrøm. Rosenborg defeated Lillestrøm 3–2 to claim the Norwegian Cup for a sixth time in their history.

Match

Details

References

1992
Football Cup
Rosenborg BK matches
Lillestrøm SK matches
1990s in Oslo
Sports competitions in Oslo
Norwegian Football Cup Final